Kõnnu is a village in Põhja-Pärnumaa Parish, Pärnu County in western-central Estonia.

It had a station on the Tallinn - Pärnu railway line operated by Elron, which closed in December 2018.

Philosopher Hermann von Keyserling (1880–1946) was born in Kõnnu Manor.

References

Villages in Pärnu County